The 2022 Dockerty Cup was a football (soccer) knockout-cup competition held between men's clubs in Victoria, Australia in 2022, the annual edition of the Dockerty Cup.  Victorian soccer clubs from the National Premier Leagues Victoria divisions, State League divisions, regional, metros and masters leagues competed for the Dockerty Cup trophy.

The cup was won by Bentleigh Greens, their third title.

The competition also served as Qualifying Rounds for the 2022 Australia Cup. In addition to the three Victorian A-League clubs, the four Preliminary Round 7 winners qualified for the final rounds of the 2022 Australia Cup, entering at the Round of 32. As there was no NPL Champion in the previous year, an additional (fifth) slot was allocated to Victoria for this edition only. This had the knock-on effect that an extra playoff-round was required for the final rounds.

Format

Preliminary rounds

Victorian clubs participated in the 2022 Australia Cup via the preliminary rounds. This was open to teams from the NPL, NPL2, NPL3,  State League divisions, regional and metros leagues. Teams were seeded in terms of which round they would enter based on their division in 2022.

The five qualifiers for the final rounds were:

Play-off round
A total of two teams took part in this stage of the competition, with the match played on 28 June.

Semi finals
A total of four teams took part in this stage of the competition, with the matches played between 5 and 12 July.

Final

References

Dockerty Cup